Angiogenin (ANG) also known as ribonuclease 5 is a small 123 amino acid protein that in humans is encoded by the ANG gene. Angiogenin is a potent stimulator of new blood vessels through the process of angiogenesis. Ang hydrolyzes cellular RNA, resulting in modulated levels of protein synthesis and interacts with DNA causing a promoter-like increase in the expression of rRNA. Ang is associated with cancer and neurological disease through angiogenesis and through activating gene expression that suppresses apoptosis.

Function 

Angiogenin is a key protein implicated in angiogenesis in normal and tumor growth. Angiogenin interacts with endothelial and smooth muscle cells resulting in cell migration, invasion, proliferation and formation of tubular structures. Ang binds to actin of both smooth muscle and endothelial cells to form complexes that activate proteolytic cascades which upregulate the production of proteases and plasmin that degrade the laminin and fibronectin layers of the basement membrane. Degradation of the basement membrane and extracellular matrix allows the endothelial cells to penetrate and migrate into the perivascular tissue. Signal transduction pathways activated by Ang interactions at the cellular membrane of endothelial cells produce extracellular signal-related kinase1/2 (ERK1/2) and protein kinase B/Akt. Activation of these proteins leads to invasion of the basement membrane and cell proliferation associated with further angiogenesis. The most important step in the angiogenesis process is the translocation of Ang to the cell nucleus. Once Ang has been translocated to the nucleus, it enhances rRNA transcription by binding to the CT-rich (CTCTCTCTCTCTCTCTCCCTC) angiogenin binding element (ABE) within the upstream intergenic region of rDNA, which subsequently activates other angiogenic factors that induce angiogenesis.

However, angiogenin is unique among the many proteins that are involved in angiogenesis in that it is also an enzyme with an amino acid sequence 33% identical to that of bovine pancreatic ribonuclease (RNase A). Ang has the same general catalytic properties as RNase A, it cleaves preferentially on the 3' side of pyrimidines and follows a transphosphorylation/hydrolysis mechanism. Although angiogenin contains many of the same catalytic residues as RNase A, it cleaves standard RNA substrates 105–106 times less efficiently than RNase A. The reason for this inefficiency is due to the 117 residue consisting of a glutamine, which blocks the catalytic site. Removal of this residue through mutation increases the ribonuclease activity between 11 and 30 fold. Despite this apparent weakness, the enzymatic activity of Ang appears to be essential for biological activity: replacements of important catalytic site residues (histidine-13 and histidine-114) invariably diminish both the ribonuclease activity toward tRNA by 10,000 fold and almost abolishes angiogenesis activities completely.

Disease

Cancer 

Ang has a prominent role in the pathology of cancer due to its functions in angiogenesis and cell survival. Since Ang possesses angiogenic activity, it makes Ang a possible candidate in therapeutic treatments of cancer. Studies of Ang and tumor relationships provide evidence for a connection between the two. The translocation of Ang to the nucleus causes an upregulation of transcriptional rRNA, while knockdown strains of Ang cause downregulation. The presence of Ang inhibitors that block translocation resulted in a decrease of tumor growth and overall angiogenesis. HeLa cells translocate Ang to the nucleus independent of cell density. In human umbilical vein endothelial cells (HUVECs), translocation of Ang to the nucleus stops after cells reach a specific density, while in HeLa cells translocation continued past that point. Inhibition of Ang affects the ability of HeLa cells to proliferate, which proposes an effective target for possible therapies.

Neurodegenerative diseases 

Due to the ability of Ang to protect motoneurons (MNs), causal links between Ang mutations and amyotrophic lateral sclerosis (ALS) are likely. The angiogenic factors associated with Ang may protect the central nervous system and MNs directly. Experiments with wild type Ang found that it slows MN degeneration in mice that had developed ALS, providing evidence for further development of Ang protein therapy in ALS treatment. Angiogenin expression in Parkinson's disease is dramatically decreased in the presence of alpha-synuclein (α-syn) aggregations. Exogenous angiogenin applied to dopamine-producing cells leads to the  phosphorylation of PKB/AKT and the activation of this complex inhibits cleavage of caspase 3 and apoptosis when cells are exposed to a Parkinson's-like inducing substance.

Gene 

Alternative splicing results in two transcript variants encoding the same protein. This gene and the gene that encodes ribonuclease, RNase A family, 4 share promoters and 5' exons. Each gene splices to a unique downstream exon that contains its complete coding region.

References

Further reading

External links
 
 
 
 
 

Biomolecules
EC 3.1.27